Stacy Boyle (born October 14, 1974) is an American former rugby union player. She played for the United States at the Women's Rugby World Cup in 1998 and in 2002.

Life 
Boyle played for Pennsylvania State University.

References

External links 
 https://www.world.rugby/tournament/1108/teams/2583

Living people
United States women's international rugby union players
American female rugby union players
Female rugby union players
1974 births
21st-century American women